Gardner–Mays Cottage is a historic home located at Charlottesville, Virginia. It was built in 1891, and is a one-over-one-room stucco cottage on a low foundation with an original one-room rear wing.  The house is typical of the many small worker's cottages built in Fifeville.

It was listed on the National Register of Historic Places in 1982.  It is located in the Fifeville and Tonsler Neighborhoods Historic District.

References

Houses on the National Register of Historic Places in Virginia
Houses completed in 1891
Houses in Charlottesville, Virginia
National Register of Historic Places in Charlottesville, Virginia
Historic district contributing properties in Virginia